Sašo Karadžov (born 11 December 1970) is a retired Macedonian football defender.

References

1975 births
Living people
Macedonian footballers
FK Vardar players
Iraklis Thessaloniki F.C. players
Association football defenders
Super League Greece players
Macedonian expatriate footballers
Expatriate footballers in Greece
Macedonian expatriate sportspeople in Greece
North Macedonia international footballers